The 2007 Grande Prairie municipal election was held Monday, October 15, 2007. Since 1968, provincial legislation has required every municipality to hold triennial elections. The citizens of Grande Prairie, Alberta, elected one mayor, eight aldermen (all at large), the five Grande Prairie School District No. 2357 trustees (at large), and five of the Grande Prairie Roman Catholic Separate School District No. 28's seven trustees (as Ward 1). Of the 33,210 eligible voters, only 9,693 turned in a ballot, a voter turnout of 29.2%, and an average of 5.9 aldermen per ballot.

Results
Bold indicates elected, and incumbents are italicized.

Mayor

Aldermen

Public School Trustees

Separate School Trustees
Unofficial

Question

References

Grande Prairie
Grande Prairie